Theano is a Python library and optimizing compiler for manipulating and evaluating mathematical expressions, especially matrix-valued ones.
In Theano, computations are expressed using a NumPy-esque syntax and compiled to run efficiently on either CPU or GPU architectures.

Theano is an open source project primarily developed by the Montreal Institute for Learning Algorithms (MILA) at the Université de Montréal.

The name of the software references the ancient philosopher Theano, long associated with the development of the golden mean.

On 28 September 2017, Pascal Lamblin posted a message from Yoshua Bengio, Head of MILA:  major development would cease after the 1.0 release due to competing offerings by strong industrial players. Theano 1.0.0 was then released on 15 November 2017.

On 17 May 2018, Chris Fonnesbeck wrote on behalf of the PyMC development team that the PyMC developers will officially assume control of Theano maintenance once they step down. On 29 January 2021, they started using the name Aesara for their fork of Theano.

Sample code
The following code is the original Theano's example.

import theano
from theano import tensor

# Declare two symbolic floating-point scalars
a = tensor.dscalar()
b = tensor.dscalar()

# Create a simple expression
c = a + b

# Convert the expression into a callable object that takes (a, b)
# values as input and computes a value for c
f = theano.function([a, b], c)

# Bind 1.5 to 'a', 2.5 to 'b', and evaluate 'c'
assert 4.0 == f(1.5, 2.5)

See also
 Comparison of deep learning software
 Differentiable programming

References

External links
  (GitHub)
 Theano at Deep Learning, Université de Montréal

Array programming languages
Deep learning software
Free science software
Numerical programming languages
Python (programming language) scientific libraries
Software using the BSD license
Articles with example Python (programming language) code
2007 software